Sikou Niakaté (born 10 July 1999) is a French professional footballer who plays as a centre-back for Primeira Liga club S.C. Braga on loan from EA Guingamp.

Club career 
Niakaté made his professional debut for Valenciennes FC in a 1–0 Ligue 2 loss to Nîmes Olympique on 31 July 2017, making his appearance at the age of 18.

On 31 August 2018, the last day of the 2018 summer transfer window, Niakaté joined Ligue 1 side Guingamp on a five-year contract. He was immediately loaned back to Valenciennes for the remainder of the season.

On 12 August 2021, he joined Metz on a season-long loan with an option to buy.

On 28 June 2022, Niakaté moved on loan to Braga in Portugal. Braga holds an option to buy his rights at the end of the loan for €1.8 million, and if he plays in half of the official games in the season, the option would become an obligation to buy.

International career 
Niakaté was called up to the France U17 national team in December 2015, becoming the first player in Évreux FC 27 history to do so. Niakaté was called up to the Mali national team for the 2018 FIFA World Cup qualification match against Gabon.

References

External links 

 
 
 
 
 

1999 births
Living people
French people of Malian descent
Sportspeople from Montreuil, Seine-Saint-Denis
Black French sportspeople
French footballers
Footballers from Seine-Saint-Denis
Association football defenders
France youth international footballers
Valenciennes FC players
En Avant Guingamp players
FC Metz players
S.C. Braga players
Ligue 2 players
Ligue 1 players
French expatriate footballers
French expatriate sportspeople in Portugal
Expatriate footballers in Portugal